The UNTV Cup Season 2 was the 2014 season of the public service-based basketball league, the UNTV Cup. It was opened on February 11, 2014, at the Smart Araneta Coliseum, Quezon City. Its final games were held on July 8, 2014, at the same venue.

UNTV Cup season two started its ceremonial toss on February 11, 2014, at the Smart Araneta Coliseum, Quezon City. Ten teams participated this season; three more teams compared to the inaugural season. Atoy Co and Ed Cordero serve as commissioner and deputy commissioner respectively during the course of UNTV Cup season two. The game ended successfully on July 8, 2014, on the same venue.

Its kick off celebration was held at One Esplanade in Pasay on January 14, 2014. Opening game was held on February 11, 2014, at Smart Araneta Coliseum in Quezon City, Philippines. Every game schedule, the teams had its own Public Service Booth during the game to give and offer public services to attendees/viewers as well as to the public. Respective teams had its representatives to cater these public services on the game venue.

Teams 
The following are the teams of public officials:

New Teams 
Four new teams were introduced this season, two of which came from the splitting of Season 1's Congress-LGU Legislators.
 House of Representatives of the Philippines (HOR) Solons
 Local Government Units (LGU) Vanguards
 Office of the President of the Philippines (Malacañang) Patriots
 Senate of the Philippines (Senate) Defenders

Group A

Group B

Elimination round 
Every schedule of the games was telecast live via the official TV partner UNTV 37, online streaming at untvweb.com and seen via monitoring centers in provincial areas in the Philippines. Its exhibition and championship games went live broadcast on its official TV Partner.

The elimination round began on February 11, 2014, at the Smart Araneta Coliseum in Cubao, Quezon City. The schedule followed a single round robin format in which all teams faced each other once in their respective group, for a total of 4 games per team.
After the first elimination round, the bottom teams per group are eliminated, and the top 4 teams per group advance to the second elimination round.
After the second elimination round, the bottom 2 teams are eliminated. The top 2 teams get outright semifinals spots, while the remaining 4 teams battle it out on the quarterfinals, with #3 team facing #6, and #4 seed playing against #5.

First round

Group A

Group B 

Original Standings

Official Standings after PhilHealth forfeit

Second round

Playoffs 

There are six teams that qualified for the playoffs. The top two teams, (#1) PNP Responders and (#2) Judiciary Magis, already advance to the semifinals holding a twice-to-beat advantage. The remaining four teams will fight for the final two semifinal slots. (#3) AFP Cavaliers and (#4) Malacañang Patriots will have a twice-to-beat advantage on the quarterfinals against (#6) Senate Defenders and (#5) MMDA Black Wolves, respectively.

Quarterfinals 
The rookie #4 team Malacañang Patriots have a twice-to-beat advantage against #5 ranked MMDA Black Wolves, while another new team and #6 seed Senate Defenders needs to win two games versus #3 team AFP Cavaliers.

MMDA won twice to eliminate Malacañang, while AFP beat Senate convincingly, 78–50, to advance to the semifinals. The Cavaliers face the undefeated PNP Responders, and the Black Wolves sets a date with the defending champion and #2 seed Judiciary Magis.

(3) AFP Cavaliers vs. (6) Senate Defenders

(4) Malacañang Patriots vs. (5) MMDA Black Wolves

Semifinals 

For the second straight season, the undefeated PNP Responders and Judiciary Magis have a twice-to-beat advantage in the semifinals after being the top 2 teams at the end of the elimination round. Quarterfinals winners AFP Cavaliers and MMDA Black Wolves would need to win twice to enter the finals.

PNP and AFP won their separate series by beating NHA and AFP, respectively, in two games.

(2) Judiciary Magis vs. (3) AFP Cavaliers

(1) PNP Responders vs. (5) MMDA Black Wolves

Battle for Third Place: (2) Judiciary Magis vs. (5) MMDA Black Wolves 

The battle for third place was between the #2 seed and former champion Judiciary Magis and #5 team MMDA Black Wolves, after they lost their semifinals series on 2 games against separate opponents. Judiciary won the game, 84–81, and gets ₱250,000 for their chosen beneficiary as third placer. Despite the loss, MMDA received ₱150,000 for charity as fourth placer.

Exhibition Game: Executive Officials vs. Team Legislators 

Before the much-awaited championship match between PNP Responders and AFP Cavaliers, two exhibition games that served as the curtain raiser were held, with two squads composed of government executives and legislators.

Executive Officials 

The Executive Officials team is composed of high-ranking officials from different departments of the executive branch listed below. They wore yellow jerseys.
 #3 Joel Villanueva – Director General, TESDA (also a player for Malacañang Patriots)
 #7 LCdr. Paul Anthony Yamamoto – Navy Officer, Presidential Security Group (also a player for Malacañang Patriots)
 #7 Daniel Razon – chairman, BMPI–UNTV
 #8 MGen. Victor Bayani – Deputy Chief of Staff for Logistics, J4, Armed Forces of the Philippines
 #9 Rafael Ragos, CPA – Deputy Director for Regional Operation Services, National Bureau of Investigation
 #12 Edmundo Arugay – Deputy Director for Administrative Services, National Bureau of Investigation
 #17 Ronnie Ricketts – chairman, Optical Media Board
 #18 Manuel Mamba, M.D. – Presidential Adviser, Office of the Presidential Adviser on Legislative Affairs; Head, Presidential Legislative Liaison Office
 #29 Carlos Jericho Petilla – Secretary, Department of Energy
 #30 Francis Zamora – Vice Mayor, San Juan City, Metro Manila
 #83 MGen. Virgilio Hernandez – Deputy Chief of Staff for Intelligence, J2, Armed Forces of the Philippines
 #84 Col. Agane Adriatico – Chief, Special Service Unit, Armed Forces of the Philippines
Head Coach: David "Boysie" Zamar

Team Legislators 

The Legislators team is composed of senators and congressmen under the legislative branch listed below. They wore blue jerseys.
 #1 Sen. Ralph Recto – Senator, Senate of the Philippines
 #2 Sen. Sonny Angara – Senator, Senate of the Philippines (also a player for Senate Defenders)
 #4 Cong. Alfred Vargas – Representative, 5th District of Quezon City
 #6 Cong. Rommel Amatong – Representative, 2nd District of Compostela Valley
 #7 Cong. Franz Alvarez – Representative, 1st District of Palawan (also a player for HOR Solons)
 #9 Cong. Niel Tupas Jr. – Representative, 5th District of Iloilo (also a player for HOR Solons)
 #14 Cong. Ansaruddin Adiong – Representative, 1st District of Lanao del Sur
 #22 Cong. Roman Romulo – Representative, Lone District of Pasig
 #23 Cong. Gary Alejano – Representative, Magdalo Partylist
 #24 Cong. Edcel "Grex" Lagman Jr. – Representative, 1st District of Albay
 #25 Cong. Mark Enverga – Representative, 1st District of Quezon
 #27 Cong. Scott Davies Lanete, M.D. – Representative, 3rd District of Masbate (also a player for HOR Solons)
 #28 Cong. Sherwin Tugna – Representative, CIBAC Partylist
 #37 Cong. Barry Gutierrez – Representative, Akbayan Partylist
 #88 Cong. Gerald Anthony Gullas Jr. – Representative, 1st District of Cebu
Head Coach: Billy Reyes

Results

UNTV Cup Finals: (1) PNP Responders vs. (3) AFP Cavaliers 

The best-of-three finals series was held on June 22 at the Ynares Sports Arena in Pasig, and July 1 and 8, 2018 at the Smart Araneta Coliseum in Quezon City. The championship is between Season 1 runner-up PNP Responders and first time finalist AFP Cavaliers. Both teams won their separate semis matchups in two games. AFP won the finals series against PNP, 2–1, to get their first title and donate ₱1.5 million to their chosen charity.

Winners and Beneficiaries 
The ten teams represented their choice of charity institutions as beneficiaries for the game. One million and five hundred thousand pesos was given to the champion while first to third runner-up teams will have six hundred fifty thousand, two hundred fifty thousand and one hundred fifty thousand pesos were given respectively.

Individual awards

Season awards 

Players were given recognition during the exhibition game of UNTV Cup Season 2:
 Ollan Omiping for Most Valuable Player (for the second straight year), Best Scorer and Best Shooting Guard
 Jaymann Misola and Ronaldo Abaya as Best Blocker and Best Small Forward
 PJ Villanueva for Best in Steals, Best Point Guard and Most Improved Player
 San Juan Vice Mayor Francis Zamora for Best Rebounder
 Eugene Tan for Best in Assists
 Ronaldo Pascual for Best Center
 John Hall for Best Power Forward
 Jeff Sanders for Best Reinforcement Player
 Alvin Zuniga for Fans’ Choice Award

A selection process for the Fan's Choice Award was organized for followers of the UNTV Cup which allowed them to vote their favorite player via online voting in the UNTV Cup's fan page website. The winner was determined based on the highest number of votes garnered by the player along with acceptable reason which the vote was cast. The award was given recognition in its season ending game on July 1, 2014, at the Smart Araneta Coliseum, in Quezon City. Online voting was officially opened from June 19, 2014, and ended by 6:00 p.m. (UTC+8) of June 27, 2014. It was Alvin Zuniga who won the said award.

Top Players of the Season
The following players have excelled in their respective categories.

Players of the Week
The following players were named the Players of the Week.

Overall standings

Elimination rounds

Playoffs

UNTV Cup Segments

Heart of a Champion 
The Heart of a Champion segment features UNTV Cup players and their lives off the court as public servants.

Top Plays 
The following segment features the top plays of the week and elimination round.

Player, Analyst and Fan Interviews 
UNTV Cup players, analysts, and fans share their thoughts in interviews.

See also 
 UNTV Cup

References

External links 
 UNTVweb.com

Members Church of God International
2014 Philippine television series debuts
2014 in Philippine sport
UNTV Cup
UNTV (Philippines) original programming